Heidi Preuss (born 18 March 1961 in Lakeport, New Hampshire) is an American former alpine skier who competed in the 1980 Winter Olympics. She is the daughter of the late Remo Preuss of Jena Germany and Elfriede Preuss of Lubeck Germany.

External links
 

1961 births
Living people
American female alpine skiers
Olympic alpine skiers of the United States
Alpine skiers at the 1980 Winter Olympics
21st-century American women